Mary Louise McDonald (born 1 May 1969) is an Irish politician who has served as Leader of the Opposition in Ireland since June 2020 and President of Sinn Féin since February 2018. She has been a Teachta Dála (TD) for the Dublin Central constituency since 2011. She previously served as Vice President of Sinn Féin from 2009 to 2018 and a Member of the European Parliament (MEP) for the Dublin constituency from 2004 to 2009.

On 10 February 2018, McDonald succeeded longtime party leader Gerry Adams as President of Sinn Féin, following a special  (party conference) in Dublin. In the 2020 general election, Sinn Féin's performance improved significantly and it was the first time in almost a century that neither Fianna Fáil nor Fine Gael won the most votes. Sinn Féin achieved the second-highest number of seats at 37, one behind Fianna Fáil's 38 seats.

Following Micheál Martin's appointment as Taoiseach in June 2020, after the formation of a Fianna Fáil, Green Party and Fine Gael coalition, McDonald became Leader of the Opposition. She is the first woman to occupy that position and the first to come from a party other than Fianna Fáil or Fine Gael since the Labour Party's Thomas Johnson in 1927.

Early life and education
Born into a middle-class family in south Dublin to builder and surveyor Patrick McDonald and housewife Joan, her parents separated when she was nine years old and she stayed with her mother in Rathgar. She has an older brother Bernard and younger twin siblings Patrick and Joanne. Her sister Joanne was involved with the socialist republican party Éirígí in the late 2000s and is a teacher. Her brother Patrick works as an intellectual property lawyer and Bernard as a scientist. McDonald's great-uncle, James O'Connor, was an member of the Anti-Treaty IRA who was executed at the Curragh Camp during the Irish Civil War. He was charged with illegally possessing firearms, which carried the death penalty at the time. O'Connor was 24 years old at the time. In January 2023, McDonald revealed that Bernard had transitioned in 2021, and that she was on a "learning curve" about transgender issues.

McDonald was educated at the Catholic all-girls, Notre Dame Des Missions in Churchtown, South Dublin, where she was involved in debating.

After school, McDonald attended Trinity College Dublin, from which she received a bachelor's degree in English Literature. She later studied industrial relations at Dublin City University, and also received a Master of Arts degree in European Integration Studies from the University of Limerick in 1995. She worked as a researcher for the Institute of European Affairs, a consultant for the Irish Productivity Centre (a human resources consultancy that was jointly operated by Ibec and ICTU) and a trainer in the Partnership Unit of the Educational and Training Services Trust.

McDonald became involved with the Irish National Congress, a cross-party republican organisation, and became chairperson in 2000, leading a protest in Dublin against the involvement of the city's Lord Mayor in the unveiling of a plaque at the location where the Grand Orange Lodge of Ireland held its first meeting in 1798.

Political career
McDonald started her political career by first joining Fianna Fáil in 1998, but she left the party after a year due to core policy differences, particularly in relation to Northern Ireland and social justice. Asked in 2014 about her participation in Fianna Fáil, McDonald stated she had been "in the wrong party" and quickly realised that Sinn Féin was a more appropriate party for her Republican views after meeting Sinn Féin members through the Irish National Congress.

European Parliament and early Dáil attempts
McDonald has been a member of the Sinn Féin party leadership since 2001. She first ran for office when she unsuccessfully contested the Dublin West constituency for Sinn Féin at the 2002 general election, polling 8.02% of first preference votes.

In September 2003, McDonald attracted criticism when she spoke at a rally in Dublin to commemorate Seán Russell, an IRA leader with links to Nazi Germany.

In 2004, McDonald became Sinn Féin's first MEP in Ireland, when she was elected at the 2004 European Parliament election for the Dublin constituency, receiving over 60,000 first preference votes. She served as one of two Sinn Féin MEPs, the other being Bairbre de Brún who was representing Northern Ireland. In 2007, she was shortlisted for the 'MEP of the Year' award by the European Parliament magazine for "making the most valuable contribution in the field of employment policy". During her time in office she led the Sinn Féin campaign against the Treaty of Lisbon, which was rejected in the Republic in 2008 but accepted in 2009. McDonald sat as a member of the European Parliament's Employment and Social Affairs Committee, and as a substitute of the Civil Liberties Committee.

She was an unsuccessful candidate in the Dublin Central constituency at the 2007 general election.

McDonald became Sinn Féin Vice President, replacing Pat Doherty, following the Sinn Féin ardfheis of 22 February 2009.

For the 2009 European Parliament election, the number of seats for Dublin in the European Parliament was reduced from four to three. McDonald was in a tight race for the last seat against Fianna Fáil's Eoin Ryan and the Socialist Party leader Joe Higgins. McDonald lost her seat to Higgins, being eliminated at the fifth count. Her first preference vote had declined to nearly 48,000.

In June 2009, McDonald faced criticism after it emerged her campaign office was selling IRA souvenirs and memorabilia.

Dáil Éireann (2011–present)

McDonald contested the Dublin Central constituency again at the 2011 general election, this time picking up 13.1% of first preference votes; she was successful in taking the last seat in the constituency. Following the election she became Sinn Féin's Spokesperson for Public Expenditure and Reform and was a member of the Public Accounts Committee from then until 2017.

In 2012, McDonald was awarded 'Opposition Politician of the Year' by TV3's Tonight with Vincent Browne political talk show.

In November 2014, McDonald refused to leave the Dáil chamber after a vote resulted in her suspension. McDonald had questioned Tánaiste Joan Burton as to whether the government would allow payments to be taken from citizens' wages or social welfare payments if they did not comply with the payment of newly introduced water charges. McDonald argued that Burton failed to directly answer her questions and was being deliberately evasive and intractable. She, along with a number of Sinn Féin colleagues, remained in the chamber for four and a half hours in protest of Burton's alleged refusal to answer her questions. In response, the Ceann Comhairle Seán Barrett adjourned the Dáil for a number of days.

In December 2015, McDonald initially backed Thomas "Slab" Murphy, who she described as a "good republican" despite him having been convicted on nine charges of tax evasion, following a trial held in the Special Criminal Court after the last person to testify against Murphy in a court was bludgeoned to death after a 1999 court case in Dublin. She later failed to back party leader Gerry Adams' assertion that Thomas Murphy is a "good republican" after a BBC Spotlight investigation accused Murphy of being a "mass murderer".

After her re-election to the Dáil in 2016 general election, in which she topped the poll in Dublin Central, she became Sinn Féin's All-Ireland Spokesperson for Mental Health and Suicide Prevention, which she held until being elected president of Sinn Féin in 2018.

Leader of Sinn Féin (2018–present)
At a Sinn Féin party conference on 18 November 2017, Gerry Adams was re-elected party leader, but announced that he would ask the Sinn Féin party leadership to call for a special Ard Fheis to be held within three months to choose a new president, and that he would not stand for re-election as TD for the Louth constituency in the next election.

At the close of nominations to succeed Adams on 20 January 2018, McDonald was announced as the President-elect of Sinn Féin, as she was the sole nominee to enter the race. She was confirmed as president at a special Ard Fheis on 10 February 2018 in Dublin.

In March 2019, McDonald was criticised by some, including Fine Gael politician Simon Coveney, for walking behind a banner in the New York City St. Patrick's day parade which read "England Get Out of Ireland". In the immediate aftermath of the incident support for Sinn Féin in opinion polls dropped from 18% to 13%, with McDonald apologising for her actions shortly afterwards, but stated she believed the message to be directed at the British state, not the English people.

Shortly afterwards on 24 May 2019, the 2019 European Parliament election in Ireland and 2019 Irish local elections were held simultaneously. In the European elections, Sinn Féin lost 2 MEPs and dropped their vote share by 7.8%, while in the local elections the party lost 78 (almost half) of their local councillors and dropped their vote share by 5.7%. The result was considered "disastrous" for Sinn Féin. McDonald stated "It was a really bad day out for us. But sometimes that happens in politics, and it’s a test for you. I mean it’s a test for me personally, obviously, as the leader".

However, at the 2020 general election, the party rebounded and attained 24.5% of the first preference votes, placing them ahead of Fine Gael by 3.6% and Fianna Fáil by 2.3%. It was the best general election result in the modern history of Sinn Féin. In the Dublin Central constituency, McDonald topped the poll with 35.7% of the first preference votes.

McDonald touted the party's electoral success as a "revolution" and expressed her desire to form a coalition government, declaring that Ireland "is no longer a two-party system". Sinn Féin TD Matt Carthy credited McDonald's leadership and her ability to clarify Sinn Féin's policies to the electorate with contributing to the stark turn around between the May elections of 2019 and the general election result of 2020. McDonald's high satisfaction rating as party leader was also cited by others as another contributing factor in Sinn Féin's result.

Leader of the Opposition (2020–present)
On 26 June 2020, Fianna Fáil, Fine Gael, and the Green Party formed a coalition government, leaving Sinn Féin as the largest opposition party, and McDonald as Leader of the Opposition. She dismissed the coalition agreement as a "marriage of convenience", and accused Fianna Fáil and Fine Gael of conspiring to exclude Sinn Féin from government.

Public image
McDonald has been credited with being part of a new generation of Sinn Féin members, who have broadened its appeal and increased its vote since she first held public office. After she became the party's first MEP in 2004 (receiving more than treble the percentage of votes the party had received five years earlier), Writing on McDonald and the 2004 election success for Sinn Féin (using the subheading '"Shopaholic Trinity girl is face of new Sinn Fein"), The Times described McDonald as "more Brown Thomas beret than balaclava" and "part of a new generation of Sinn Féiners." The paper continued by stating that "another Trinity graduate was elected in Donaghmede, while party candidates in Dublin also included a philosophy student and somebody called Pembroke, an unlikely name for a republican. The irony is that the smoked-salmon socialists are just as effective at mopping up working-class votes as the middle-aged Sinn Fein men who saw 'action' in the 1980s or served time in prison. McDonald stretched the Sinn Fein constituency to the full, attracting votes and transfers from leafy suburbs as well as ghettoes."

McDonald has been credited for her leadership ability and popular appeal. Kathy Sheridan of The Irish Times wrote of McDonald: "It is a cliche to say that Mary Lou McDonald is an enigma but it's nonetheless true. Likable, warm and approachable yet never quite revealing herself. A straight-talker who appears to shoot from the hip yet says nothing that has not been thoroughly considered." Sheridan also claimed that she was "the embodiment of educated, Dublin 6 middle-class privilege who peddles a persuasive anti-establishment line and attracts the kind of adoring scrums last seen in Bertie Ahern’s heyday." Sheridan summarised that she had brought Sinn Féin into the mainstream of Irish politics." As of November 2021, Sinn Féin, under her leadership, was the most popular party in opinion polls.

Those critical of McDonald's public image point to her handling of allegations of bullying and other abuses within Sinn Féin. Critics have negatively responded to her reaction to the Máiría Cahill affair of the 2010s, in which Cahill alleged that members of the Provisional IRA had sexually abused her as a teenager and subsequently that this information was suppressed by members of Sinn Féin. McDonald's handling in 2022 of allegations of bullying within the party from Violet-Anne Wynne have also been met with criticism, with journalist Jennifer Bray describing the situation as putting McDonald and her leadership "in a very unflattering light". From 2015 onwards, McDonald has had to distance herself from former Sinn Féin councillor Jonathan Dowdall, who in 2018 was found guilty of the kidnap and torture of a man, and in 2022 plead guilty to the killing of David Byrne. Dowdall became a Sinn Féin councillor in 2014 in McDonald's constituency and has been described by the Guardian as a McDonald "protege" during the year-long period in which he worked as a councillor. The Guardian went on to suggest that the Dowdall connection had "tainted" McDonald's image.

Personal life
McDonald's husband, Martin Lanigan, works as a gas control superintendent for the emergency dispatch division of Gas Networks Ireland, a state infrastructure provider, and the couple has two children.
She learned Transcendental Meditation "...for resilience and for keeping myself grounded and calm."

Health
McDonald has asthma. In April 2020, she announced that she had tested positive for COVID-19 following a test she took on 28 March. In a statement she said that she had recovered from the condition but had developed pleurisy in her right lung. She said that the Public Health Doctor had told her that she was no longer infected or infectious.

References

External links

 Mary Lou McDonald's page on the Sinn Féin website
 
 The voices of women must be heard when it comes to healthcare – Mary Lou McDonald TD. An Phoblacht. Published 24 July 2018.

1969 births
21st-century women MEPs for the Republic of Ireland
21st-century women Teachtaí Dála
Alumni of Dublin City University
Alumni of Trinity College Dublin
Alumni of the University of Limerick
Fianna Fáil politicians
Irish republicans
Leaders of Sinn Féin
Living people
MEPs for the Republic of Ireland 2004–2009
Members of the 31st Dáil
Members of the 32nd Dáil
Members of the 33rd Dáil
People from Rathgar
Politicians from County Dublin
Sinn Féin MEPs
Sinn Féin TDs (post-1923)